Alfred Post may refer to:

 Alfred Charles Post (1806–1886), American surgeon
 Alfred Post (footballer) (1926–2013), German footballer
Alfred Post (zoologist); see Diretmoides
Alfred M. Post (1847–1923), Justice of the Nebraska Supreme Court